Buenaventura Blanco y Elguero (Helguero) (born 1696 in Valladolid) was a Spanish clergyman and bishop for the Roman Catholic Archdiocese of Antequera, Oaxaca. He was ordained in 1753. He was appointed bishop in 1754. He died in 1764.

References 

1696 births
1764 deaths
Spanish Roman Catholic bishops
People from Valladolid